"Personal Jesus" is a song by English electronic music band Depeche Mode. It was released as the lead single from their seventh studio album, Violator (1990), in 1989. It reached No. 13 on the UK Singles Chart and No. 28 on the Billboard Hot 100. The single was their first to make the US Top 40 since 1984's "People Are People", and was their first gold-certified single in the US (quickly followed by its successor, "Enjoy the Silence"). In Germany, "Personal Jesus" is one of the band's longest-charting songs, staying on the singles chart for 23 weeks.

In 2004, "Personal Jesus" was ranked No. 368 in Rolling Stones list of "The 500 Greatest Songs of All Time", and in September 2006 it was voted as one of the "100 Greatest Songs Ever" in Q magazine. "Personal Jesus" was rereleased as a single on 30 May 2011 for the Depeche Mode remix album Remixes 2: 81–11, with the leading remix by the production team Stargate. The song has been covered by numerous artists, including Johnny Cash in 2002 and Marilyn Manson in 2004.

Background and composition
In mid-1989, the band began recording in Milan with record producer Flood. The result of this session was the single "Personal Jesus", which featured a catchy bluesy riff and drum-based sound, radically different from anything the band had released thus far. Although not the first Depeche Mode song to feature guitar parts ("Behind the Wheel" and their cover of "Route 66" featured a guitar; "Love, in Itself" and "And Then..." from Construction Time Again and "Here is the House" from Black Celebration featured an acoustic guitar), it was the first time a guitar was used as a dominant instrument in a Depeche Mode song. The song was inspired by the book Elvis and Me by Priscilla Presley. According to songwriter Martin Gore:
 "Personal Jesus" is written in the key of F minor with a tempo of 194 beats per minute in  time.

Promotion and release
Prior to its release, advertisements were placed in the personal columns of regional newspapers in the UK with the words "Your own personal Jesus." Later, the ads included a phone number one could dial to hear the song. The ensuing controversy helped propel the single to No. 13 on the UK charts, becoming one of Depeche Mode's biggest sellers. The single was particularly successful commercially thanks to the fact that it was released six months prior to the album it would later appear on. Up to that point, it was the best selling 12" single in Warner Bros. history.

"Personal Jesus" had a plethora of remixes, almost unprecedented for Depeche Mode at the time. While most other Depeche Mode singles prior to "Personal Jesus" usually had band-made extended mixes, Depeche Mode started to invite more DJs and mixers to the fold, which would become the mainstay for all future Depeche Mode singles. François Kevorkian (who did the mixing for the Violator album, in general) mixed the single version, the "Holier Than Thou Approach", the "Pump Mix", and the lesser-known "Kazan Cathedral Mix" (which was not available on any of the singles), while producer Flood mixed the "Acoustic" version and the "Telephone Stomp Mix" as well as the single version and "Sensual Mix" of the single's B-side "Dangerous". The "Hazchemix" and "Hazchemix Edit" of "Dangerous" were mixed by Daniel Miller.

The back-cover of "Personal Jesus" features one of the band members and the back-side of a naked woman. The band member she is with depends on whether it is the 7" vinyl (Martin Gore), the 12" vinyl (Dave Gahan), the cassette (Andy Fletcher), or the original CD (Alan Wilder). On some copies she does not appear at all, such as the 2004 CD re-release, and on promo copies. On some limited releases, like the GBong17, all four photos are available plus one photo of the full group with Martin hugging the woman.

Critical reception
David Giles from Music Week wrote, "Their first release for over two years, and hardly a radical style departure. Stark and foreboding, and still employing the distinctive technique of vocal harmonies an octave apart. Strong enought to go top five, but fast losing ground to the Belgium beat experimentalists."

Impact and legacy
In 2011, Slant Magazine listed the song at number 81 in their ranking of "The 100 Best Singles of the 1990s", writing, "Depeche Mode's gimmick is one that, after years of repetition, seems ingeniously flimsy, bundling angst and spiritual frustration with sex and pouty gloom. 'Personal Jesus' has escaped the mustiness that has enveloped most of the band's material not by flouting these tactics, but by embodying them so well. Bolstered by Dave Gahan's repeated imprecation to 'reach out and touch faith', the vocals seem perched on a neutral point between the completely earnest and the bitterly sarcastic, turning what could have been another flat religious diatribe into a thinly dual-tiered assessment of devotion and self-absorption." In 2017, Billboard ranked "Personal Jesus" second behind only "Enjoy the Silence" on a list of their "20 Best Depeche Mode Songs".

Robert Smith of the Cure listed "Personal Jesus" as one of his 30 favourite songs from the 1980s.

Sex Pistols and Public Image Ltd singer John Lydon commented on the track, "it's a serious problem for me, all this technology. The people who've used it best would be Depeche Mode. 'Your own Personal Jesus!' Bloody 'ell mate, they got it! They were using the Casiotone effect and they wrapped a song around it, but they didn't let it dictate to the song. That's another tune I just absolutely love - I was so impressed with the bravery of attempting such a subject matter."

Music video
Anton Corbijn directed the music video for "Personal Jesus" and is his first Depeche Mode video in color. It features the band on a ranch (suggested to appear as a brothel), filmed in the Tabernas Desert of Almería, in Spain. MTV edited out some suggestive mouth movements of Martin Gore during the bridge and replaced it with some other footage from the video.

Track listings
All songs written by Martin Gore.

7", Cassette Mute / Bong17, CBong17 (UK)
"Personal Jesus" – 3:44
"Dangerous" – 4:20
7" Mute / GBong17 (UK)
"Personal Jesus" – 3:44
"Dangerous (Hazchemix Edit)" – 3:01
"Personal Jesus (Acoustic)" – 3:26
12", mini-CD Mute / 12Bong17, CDBong17 (UK)
"Personal Jesus (Holier Than Thou Approach)" – 5:51
"Dangerous (Sensual Mix)" – 5:24
"Personal Jesus (Acoustic)" – 3:26
Limited 12", mini-CD Mute / L12Bong17, LCDBong17 (UK)
"Personal Jesus (Pump Mix)" – 7:47
"Personal Jesus (Telephone Stomp Mix)" – 5:32
"Dangerous (Hazchemix)" – 5:34

CD Mute / CDBong17X (EU)
"Personal Jesus" – 3:44
"Dangerous" – 4:20
"Personal Jesus (Acoustic)" – 3:26
"Dangerous (Hazchemix Edit)" – 3:01
"Personal Jesus (Holier Than Thou Approach)" – 5:51
"Dangerous (Sensual Mix)" – 5:24
"Personal Jesus (Pump Mix)" – 7:47
"Personal Jesus (Telephone Stomp Mix)" – 5:32
"Dangerous (Hazchemix)" – 5:34
This CD is the 2004 re-release
CD Sire/Reprise / 21328-2 (US)
"Personal Jesus" – 3:44
"Personal Jesus (Holier Than Thou Approach)" – 5:51
"Dangerous (Hazchemix)" – 5:34
"Personal Jesus (Pump Mix)" – 7:47
"Personal Jesus (Acoustic)" – 3:26
"Dangerous (Sensual Mix)" – 5:24
"Personal Jesus (Telephone Stomp Mix)" – 5:32
"Dangerous" – 4:20
US single released 19 September 1989

Mixes

Personal Jesus

Francois Kevorkian 
 Album Version
 Single Version (7" version)
 Holier Than Thou Approach (12" version)
 Pump Mix
 Kazan Cathedral Mix (only available on the limited 4-disc edition of Remixes 81–04 and Just Say Da (volume IV of the "Just Say Yes" series))

Flood 
 Telephone Stomp Mix

Dangerous

Flood 
 Single Version (7" version)
 Sensual Mix (12" version)

Daniel Miller 
 Hazchemix
 Hazchemix Edit

Charts

Weekly charts

Certifications

"Personal Jesus 2011"

"Personal Jesus 2011" is the preceding single to the remix compilation album Remixes 2: 81–11. The digital single was released in the UK on 18 April 2011 and a day later in the US. It was released on CD and vinyl on 30 May 2011.

Track listings
CD (Bong43)
"Personal Jesus" (The Stargate Mix) – 3:57
"Personal Jesus" (Alex Metric Remix) – 5:57
"Personal Jesus" (Eric Prydz Remix) – 7:26
"Personal Jesus" (M.A.N. Remix) – 5:24
"Personal Jesus" (Sie Medway-Smith Remix) – 6:25

12" vinyl
"Personal Jesus" (Alex Metric Remix) – 5:54
"Personal Jesus" (M.A.N. Remix) – 5:22
"Personal Jesus" (The Stargate Mix) – 3:56
"Personal Jesus" (Eric Prydz Remix) – 7:25
"Personal Jesus" (Sie Medway-Smith Remix) – 6:25

Digital Download
"Personal Jesus" (The Stargate Mix) – 3:56
"Personal Jesus" (Alex Metric Remix Edit) – 3:27

Beatport Exclusive Digital Download
"Personal Jesus" (Eric Prydz Remix) – 7:26
"Never Let Me Down Again" (Eric Prydz Remix) – 7:01

Promo CD (PCDBong43)
"Personal Jesus" (The Stargate Mix) – 3:57
"Personal Jesus" (Alex Metric Remix Edit) – 3:27
"Personal Jesus" (Alex Metric Remix) – 5:57
"Personal Jesus" (Eric Prydz Remix) – 7:26
"Personal Jesus" (M.A.N. Remix) – 5:24
"Personal Jesus" (Sie Medway-Smith Remix) – 6:25

iTunes Store
"Personal Jesus" (Alex Metric Remix) – 5:57
"Personal Jesus" (Eric Prydz Remix) – 7:26
"Personal Jesus" (M.A.N. Remix) – 5:24
"Personal Jesus" (Sie Medway-Smith Dub) – 5:56

Charts

Johnny Cash cover
In 2002, American country singer Johnny Cash covered "Personal Jesus" for his album American IV: The Man Comes Around. The idea to cover the song was suggested by record producer Rick Rubin. Cash called it "probably the most evangelical gospel song I ever recorded".

Marilyn Manson cover

Marilyn Manson released their cover version of the track as the only previously unreleased recording included on their 2004 greatest hits album Lest We Forget: The Best Of. The band's eponymous vocalist explained to MTV that he decided to cover "Personal Jesus" as: "I thought if I had to write a song, [the lyrics of 'Personal Jesus' are] exactly what I would say. ... I think it takes a little more of an ironic tone when you put it in context with what's going on today." He additionally described the original song and Depeche Mode's music in general as hypnotic, sexy and inspirational. Its music video was directed by Manson and Nathan Cox. The song won an award in the 'pop' category of the 2005 BMI Awards, while its music video received two nominations at the 2005 Music Video Production Awards. As of 2020, the track has sold over 78,000 physical and digital copies in the United Kingdom, where it was also streamed over 4 million times.

Formats and track listings
European 7" and United States 10" singles
"Personal Jesus" – 4:06
"Personal Jesus"  – 5:50

CD single
"Personal Jesus" – 4:06
"This Is the New Shit"  – 4:28

International maxi single
"Personal Jesus" – 4:06
"Mobscene Replet"  – 4:35
"Personal Jesus"  – 5:50
"Personal Jesus" 

UK maxi single
"Personal Jesus" – 4:06
"New Shit Invective"  – 4:25
"Mobscene Replet"  – 4:35
"Personal Jesus"

Charts

Other versions
British singer Jamelia used a sample from the song for her 2006 single "Beware of the Dog". Also American singer and actress Hilary Duff used a "Personal Jesus" sample as the basis of her 2008 single "Reach Out".

In 2013, former Van Halen frontman Sammy Hagar covered the song on his twelfth studio album Sammy Hagar & Friends. Hagar commented at the time, "I've gotta tell you, as I studied that lick I went 'That is a blues fricken' lick.' For an electronic band, some bizarre alternative electronic band, that's a badass blues lick. And I played it on guitar and said, 'This is it.' And Neal Schon, the intro on that thing, the licks Neal's playing, it's in high gear. I can't wait till the Depeche Mode guys hear it. I think when they hear it they're going to say, "Sammy Hagar, that (expletive) rock and roll freak?" Haha. They've gotta like it. It's a blues song and it's a great lyric, a great deep, dark lyric. I can't write lyrics like that. It's too dark for me."

In 2018, British rock band Def Leppard released their own version of the song. Guitarist Phil Collen said, "Depeche Mode [started out] really poppy like a lot of bands that disappeared, then all of a sudden they started doing things like 'Personal Jesus' – and it was like 'woah' … It has an element of cool that was different from the earlier Depeche Mode stuff. I found it really inspiring how this article that said Depeche Mode sold out more than Bieber or Taylor Swift. We [felt] a tear of pride and joy for them – the fact that they carried on, never stopped … and it's sort of the way we see ourselves."

See also
List of cover versions of Depeche Mode songs - "Personal Jesus"

References

External links
"Personal Jesus" single information from the official Depeche Mode web site
"Personal Jesus 2011" single information from the official Depeche Mode web site
Personal Jesus review at AllMusic
Personal Jesus 2011 review at AllMusic

1989 singles
1989 songs
2004 singles
2011 singles
Depeche Mode songs
Interscope Records singles
Johnny Cash songs
Marilyn Manson (band) songs
Music videos directed by Anton Corbijn
Music videos shot in Spain
Mute Records singles
Nothing Records singles
Song recordings produced by Flood (producer)
Songs written by Martin Gore
Cultural depictions of Jesus